The French Pacific Handball Cup is the official competition for the senior national handball teams of the overseas departments and territories of France based in the Oceania region, namely New Caledonia, Tahiti and Wallis and Futuna. This competition is organised by the Oceania Continent Handball Federation (OCHF).

Women's tournament

Junior Men's tournament

Youth Men's tournament

Women's Youth tournament

External links 
 Oceania Continent Handball Federation webpage
 Handball Oceania Archive on Todor66.com
 Oceania archive on Les Sport Info (French)
 Campeões Estaduais de Handebol (Spanish)

Handball competitions in Oceania
Pacific Handball Cup